The 2019 Ontario Men's Curling Championship, better known as the Tankard, the 2019 provincial men's curling championship for Southern Ontario, was held from January 27 to February 3 at the Woolwich Memorial Centre in Elmira, Ontario. The winning Scott McDonald team would represent Ontario at the 2019 Tim Hortons Brier in Brandon, Manitoba. The event is being held in conjunction with the 2019 Ontario Scotties Tournament of Hearts, the provincial women's curling championship.

Unlike the 2018 event, the 2019 Tankard returned to having a round-robin format.

Qualification Process
The original qualification process called for 10 teams to qualify from three cash spiels (two each), an open qualifier (two teams), plus the top two southern Ontario teams in the CTRS standings (as of December 9, 2018). However, CurlON announced on December 5, 2018 that a third CTRS team (Team Scott McDonald) would be allowed to directly qualify for the Tankard, as the team was in the top 10 in the CTRS standings at the time, and had a scheduling conflict preventing them from participating in the first round of cash spiel qualifiers (they were playing in the 2018 National). McDonald's direct entry took a qualifying spot away from Cash Spiel #2. This change in qualification was not without controversy.

Teams
The team lineups are as follows:

Standings

Round-robin results

Draw 1
January 27, 7:00pm

Draw 2
January 28, 9:00am

Draw 3
January 28, 4:00pm

Draw 6
January 29, 2:30pm

Draw 7
January 29, 7:30pm

Draw 8
January 30, 9:30am

Draw 9
January 30, 2:30pm

Draw 10
January 30, 7:30pm

Draw 11
January 31, 9:30am

Draw 12
January 31, 2:30pm

Draw 13
January 31, 7:30pm

Draw 14
February 1, 9:30am

Draw 15
February 1, 2:30pm

Draw 16
February 1, 7:30pm

Playoffs

1 vs. 2
February 2, 2:00pm

3 vs. 4
February 2, 2:00pm

Semifinal
February 3, 9:30am

Final
February 3, 2:30pm

Qualification

Cash Spiel #1
December 14–16, Acton Curling Club, Acton

Tiebreakers
Lobel 6, Krell 3
Richard 6, Willsey 4

Cash Spiel #2
December 14–16, RCMP Curling Club, Ottawa

Cash Spiel #3
January 4–6, Leaside Curling Club, East York, Toronto

Open Qualifier
January 11–13, Penetanguishene Curling Club, Penetanguishene

References

2019
2019 in Canadian curling
Woolwich, Ontario
Ontario Tankard
January 2019 sports events in Canada
February 2019 sports events in Canada
Sport in the Regional Municipality of Waterloo
2019 Tim Hortons Brier